The Desert Valley League is an American high school sports league primarily within the Coachella Valley of Riverside County, California with some schools from surrounding areas. The league is affiliated with the CIF Southern Section.

As of the 2018 season, teams in the league include:

Banning High School Broncos 
Cathedral City High School Lions
Coachella Valley High School Mighty Arabs
Desert Hot Springs High School Golden Eagles
Desert Mirage High School Rams
Indio High School Rajahs
Twentynine Palms High School Wildcats
Yucca Valley High School Trojans

References

External links
2012 DVL information
Standings for DVL high school teams - 2004-05 DVL information

CIF Southern Section leagues
Coachella Valley
Indio, California
Sports in Riverside County, California